Sellyakh Bay is a bay in Ust-Yansky District, Sakha Republic (Yakutia), Russian Federation.

There are no settlements in the bay area, the nearest inhabited place is Tumat to the south. Formerly there was a temporary Polar station in Makar Island.

Geography
The bay opens to the north in the eastern shores of the Yana Bay, Laptev Sea. It is located northeast of the mouths of the Chondon and southeast of the Makar and Shelonsky Islands. The Manyko Peninsula encloses the bay to the northwest and to the north the bay is limited by a narrow spit with Cape Turuktakh at the end.

Hydrography
The shores of the bay are fringed by shoals. They are low and in parts boggy, part of a flat region dotted with lakes.

See also
Yana-Indigirka Lowland

References

External links
Fishing & Tourism in Yakutia
Wetlands of Russia

Bays of the Sakha Republic
Bays of the Laptev Sea
East Siberian Lowland

ceb:Sellyakhskaya Guba
it:Baia del Selljach
sah:Сиэллээх тамах